Marsipiophora christophi is a moth of the family Noctuidae first described by Nikolay Grigoryevich Erschoff in 1864. It is found in Turkmenistan, Kazakhstan and Iran.

The wingspan is 48–56  mm.

References

External links 
 "Marsipiophora christophi" Animal Diversity Web.
 "Marsipiophora christophi Erschoff 1874". Encyclopedia of Life.
 "Marsipiophora christophi (Erschoff, 1874)". Insecta.pro.

Calpinae